The 1945–46 National Football League was the 15th staging of the National Football League, an annual Gaelic football tournament for the Gaelic Athletic Association county teams of Ireland.

The NFL returned after the four-year gap due to The Emergency / Second World War. Meath won, beating Wexford in the final.

Format 
There were four divisions – Northern, Southern, Eastern and Western. Division winners played off for the NFL title.

League-phase results and tables

Group one (Dr Lagan Cup)
Down, Tyrone, Armagh, Derry, Antrim

Group two

Table

Group three

Group four
 won, from Leitrim, Sligo, Mayo, Roscommon

Group five

Results

Table

Group Six
Dublin won, from Kildare, Laois, Wicklow, Offaly

Knockout phase

Inter-group play-offs

Semi-final

Final

References

National Football League
National Football League
National Football League (Ireland) seasons